Maraghan (also Romanized as Marāghān; also known as Margan) is a village in Baryaji Rural District, in the Central District of Sardasht County, West Azerbaijan Province, Iran. At the 2006 census, its population was 384, in 78 families.

References 

Populated places in Sardasht County